Anne Spencer Lindbergh (October 2, 1940 – December 10, 1993) was an American writer, primarily of children's novels. She was the daughter of aviators/authors Charles Lindbergh and Anne Morrow Lindbergh.

Biography 
Anne Lindbergh was raised in Darien, Connecticut. After studying at Radcliffe College for three years, she moved to Paris to continue her education, studying at the Sorbonne. She met and married a fellow student there, Julien Feydy, who later became a political scientist and university professor. They later divorced.

She later married Jerzy Sapieyevski, a composer and conductor she met in Europe and with whom she moved to Washington. They also divorced. She was married to Noel Perrin, American essayist and a professor at Dartmouth College, at the time of her death. They lived together in Thetford Center, Vermont.

Anne Lindbergh wrote numerous books, most of them for children.

Anne Lindbergh died of cancer in 1993 at her home in Thetford Center, Vermont, at the age of 53.

Personal 
Anne Lindbergh's eldest brother, Charles Augustus Lindbergh Jr., the first of six children born to Charles and Anne Lindbergh, died in 1932 in a famous kidnapping — what many termed at the time "the crime of the century". Anne's other Lindbergh siblings are aquanaut Jon Lindbergh (1932–2021), Land Morrow Lindbergh (born 1937), conservationist Scott Lindbergh (born 1942), and Reeve Lindbergh (born 1945).

Honors, awards, distinctions 
Anne Lindbergh was the recipient of numerous honors for her work, including an award from the International Reading Association.

Books 
This list includes all known titles at WorldCat.
 Osprey Island, illustrated by Maggie Kaufman Smith (1974), as by Anne Lindbergh Feydy,
 The People in Pineapple Place (1982)
 Nobody's Orphan (1983)
 Bailey's Window (1984)
 The Worry Week (1985)
 The Hunky-Dory Dairy (1986)
 Next Time, Take Care, illus. Susan Hoguet (1987), picture book 
 The Shadow on the Dial (1987)
 The Prisoner of Pineapple Place (1988), sequel to The People
 Tidy Lady, illus. Susan Hoguet (1989), picture book
 Three Lives to Live (1992)
 Travel Far, Pay No Fare (1992)
 Nick of Time (1994), posthumous publication
 Local Vertical: Poems (2000)
 The Inside Story on Henry Alcebiades Highfllie (2004), stories privately printed by David R. Godine

References

External links 

 

1940 births
1993 deaths
American children's writers
People from Thetford, Vermont
Charles Lindbergh
20th-century American women writers